Celina is a city in and the county seat of Clay County, Tennessee, United States. The population was 1,495 at the 2010 census.

History

Celina was founded in the 19th century and named after the daughter of local pioneer entrepreneur and educator, Moses Fisk. In the late 19th century, Celina prospered as a logging town, receiving logs that had been cut in the forests to the east and floated down the Obey River. In 1878, African Americans were violently driven out of Celina.

Geography
Celina is located near the center of Clay County at  (36.548379, -85.501980). The city is situated in a relatively broad valley surrounded by rugged hills characteristic of the eastern Highland Rim.  This valley is created by the confluence of the Cumberland River, which approaches from the north, and the Obey River, which approaches from the east.  This section of both rivers is part of Cordell Hull Lake, a reservoir created by Cordell Hull Dam near Carthage several miles to the southwest.  Dale Hollow Dam, which creates the vast Dale Hollow Lake, lies along the Obey River just east of Celina.

Tennessee State Route 52 passes through the city, connecting it with Red Boiling Springs and Lafayette to the west and Livingston to the southeast. Tennessee State Route 53, which intersects SR 52 in the southern part of Celina, runs southwestward down the Cumberland River to Gainesboro, and northeastward to the Kentucky border, where it continues as Kentucky Route 61 in the direction of Burkesville.

Climate
The climate in this area is characterized by hot, humid summers and generally mild to cool winters.  According to the Köppen Climate Classification system, Celina has a humid subtropical climate, abbreviated "Cfa" on climate maps.

Demographics

2020 census

As of the 2020 United States census, there were 1,422 people, 728 households, and 405 families residing in the city.

2000 census
As of the census of 2000, there were 1,379 people, 645 households, and 383 families residing in the city. The population density was 1,144.0 people per square mile (440.0/km2). There were 709 housing units at an average density of 588.2 per square mile (226.2/km2). The racial makeup of the city was 96.01% White, 1.38% African American, 0.51% Native American, 0.29% Asian, 0.07% Pacific Islander, and 1.74% from two or more races. Hispanic or Latino of any race were 0.58% of the population.

There were 645 households, out of which 23.9% had children under the age of 18 living with them, 38.0% were married couples living together, 16.0% had a female householder with no husband present, and 40.6% were non-families. 36.7% of all households were made up of individuals, and 17.8% had someone living alone who was 65 years of age or older. The average household size was 2.12 and the average family size was 2.75.

In the city, the population was spread out, with 21.2% under the age of 18, 7.5% from 18 to 24, 26.5% from 25 to 44, 25.6% from 45 to 64, and 19.2% who were 65 years of age or older. The median age was 41 years. For every 100 females, there were 79.6 males. For every 100 females age 18 and over, there were 79.7 males.

The median income for a household in the city was $19,435, and the median income for a family was $29,732. Males had a median income of $21,494 versus $15,096 for females. The per capita income for the city was $12,328. About 20.5% of families and 28.2% of the population were below the poverty line, including 41.5% of those under age 18 and 28.1% of those age 65 or over.

References

External links

 Obey River, Tennessee tourism website
 Municipal Technical Advisory Service entry for Celina — information on local government, elections, and link to charter

Cities in Tennessee
Cities in Clay County, Tennessee
County seats in Tennessee